Bagasis (also spelled Bakasis and Bagayasha) was a Parthian prince, who played an important role in Parthian politics from 148/7 BC, where he was appointed the governor of the newly conquered region of Media by his brother and king Mithridates I. Bagasis was initially suggested by the modern historian Gholamreza F. Assar (2005) to have ruled as king briefly in 126 BC, but he later retracted this suggestion (2009). Bagasis was survived by an unnamed son, who occupied high offices under Mithridates II.

References

Sources 
 
 
  
 
 
 

2nd-century BC Iranian people
Parthian princes
Generals of the Parthian Empire